Zoe Nicholson is a feminist activist, author and a longtime member of the National Organization for Women. Openly lesbian, she is known for her role in the campaign for the Equal Rights Amendment.

Professional life and education
Nicholson earned a bachelor's degree in Roman Catholic Theology from Quincy University in 1969 and a master's degree in ethics and religion from the University of Southern California in 1975. She taught high school for five years, but left in 1976 to open a women's bookstore in California called Magic Speller Bookstore.

She has also worked as a systems analyst, production tester, and project leader on Wall Street, as well as co-founding a specialized recruiting firm offering expertise in client/server architecture and graphical design. Nicolson has a dozen websites reflecting her diverse interests, including her own blog.

Activism and writings

In 2003, Nicholson published The Passionate Heart, an account of her experiences with Buddhism. That same year, she also published Matri, Letters from the Mother which is "a small, very intimate collection of letters from the Divine Mother to the women of the world."

In 2010, during a stump speech by President Barack Obama for Senator Barbara Boxer, she was escorted from the event by Secret Service when she began "yelling" about issues of equality surrounding Don't Ask Don't Tell.  The President, noticing the commotion, asked Nicholson "I’m sorry—do you want to come up here?"

Nicolson was featured in the gay rights film March On, about the National Equality March 2009, which she participated in; the film premiered September 12, 2010 at the Austin Gay and Lesbian International Film Festival. She is featured in the 2022 documentary, Still Working 9 to 5.

Advocacy for the Equal Rights Amendment 
Nicholson is a longtime proponent for the Equal Rights Amendment. She marched and lectured on gender equality for seven years, at the end of which in 1982 she embarked on a fast in Springfield, Illinois with six other women to convince state legislators in Illinois to ratify the Equal Rights Amendment. In 1982 she was quoted as saying, "My participation in the women's movement is my spiritual life. It's a social gospel when I act out my beliefs through the women's movement." Other women who participated in non-violent political action for the ERA in Illinois that year included Georgia Fuller, Berenice Carroll, Mary Lee Sargent and Sonia Johnson.

For 37 days she lived on only water. In 2004 she published her memoir of this fast, titled The Hungry Heart: A Woman's Fast for Justice. She wrote a one-woman play called, "Tea With Alice and Me" about how Alice Paul has inspired and informed her activism. She is a member of the ERA Roundtable, a lifelong member of the National Organization for Women and a member of the Veteran Feminists of America. In the summer of 2022, Nicholson was awarded a lifetime achievement award from NOW for her contributions to feminism.

References

American feminist writers
American spiritual writers
Living people
Year of birth missing (living people)
American women non-fiction writers
American women's rights activists
Equal Rights Amendment activists
21st-century American women writers
American lesbian writers
National Organization for Women
National Organization for Women people